Burhanlı can refer to:

 Burhanlı, Ceyhan
 Burhanlı, Gelibolu
 Burhanlı, Kastamonu